The 2002–2003 conflict in the Pool Department was a military conflict between the government of the Republic of the Congo and the rebel Ninja militia which lasted from 2002 to 2003. It began in March 2002, when clashes between Ninja militias and the government drove thousands of civilians from their homes. On 12 March 2003, it was reported by the European Commission that the conflict had left 200,000 people "vulnerable and displaced". The conflict ended on 17 March 2003, when the government and the rebels signed a ceasefire.

Background 
The Ninja militias and other militias had been demobilizing and reintegrating for while after the Republic of the Congo Civil War (1997–1999) ended. In 19 July, 2001, a new program called the Haut Commissariat pour le Demobilisiation et Reinsertion des exCombatant (HC, hereafter) was set up to reintegrate approximately 9,000 ex-combatants from three militias including the Ninjas. To help in the effort the HC, the HC started negotiations with the Ninja to help increase disarmament and reintegration efforts in the Pool district.

Thing went smoothly until 21 March 2002 when Ninja leader Frederic Bitsangou terminated negotiations between the HC and Ninja during a press with the High Commissioner of the HC Minister Ngakala. This termination could have been anywhere from a tantamount to a declaration of war, but the Republic of the Congo still increased its military pressure against the Pool region.

Timeline 
Fighting first started in Pool in late March when Ninja militiamen attacked several government military positions in Pool. The Ninjas claimed the attack was provoked when they discovered government plans to arrest their leader, Frederic Bintsamou.

After the alleged attack by the Ninjas on a train on 2 April 2002, the government started to reduce access of humanitarian agencies to the region and increased armed clashes in the area leading to an unknown number of deaths and the internal displacement being increased by 75,000. Due to military bombardments during this time the UNDP was unable to support the reintegration of ex-combatants which was originally requested by the government.

On 14 June, a battle in an airport in Brazzaville resulted in 100 people being killed.

By December 2002 the government started doing a thing called "humanitarian corridors" where they would allow Ninja militiamen to leave the Pool district and reintegrate. And between June to December 2002 the Brazzaville Military Hospital reported 262 wounded in-patients. Of which there were 121 civilian, and 141 military wounded patients.

On 17 March 2003, the government and the Ninjas signed a ceasefire, ending the conflict.

Human rights violations 
According to a witnesses, government forces had launched helicopter attacks on inhabited villages in the Pool region, killing and wounding "an unknown number of civilians" with indiscriminate rocket and machine-gun fire. She also said that uniformed men were raping women and young men were being abducted from IDP camps. There were also lots of destruction of houses in property in Pool.

References 

2002 in the Republic of the Congo
2003 in the Republic of the Congo
Civil wars involving the states and peoples of Africa
Conflicts in 2002
Conflicts in 2003
Insurgencies in Africa
Wars involving the Republic of the Congo